The 1927 national convention of the Conservative Party of Norway was held in Oslo. The convention re-elected Carl Joachim Hambro as party leader and discussed the construction of the Flåm Line.

References

Politics of Norway
Conservative Party (Norway)
1927 in Norway
1927 conferences
Political party assemblies